Korean Temple Bell, part of the sound installation by composer Robert Coburn called Bell and Wind Environment (along with Bell Circles II), is an outdoor bronze bell by an unknown Korean artist, housed in a brick and granite pagoda outside the Oregon Convention Center in Portland, Oregon, United States.

History
The temple bell was gifted by the people of Ulsan, South Korea, and dedicated on January 11, 1989. It cost $59,000 and was funded through the Convention Center's One Percent for Art program and by private donors. According to the Smithsonian Institution, some residents raised concerns about the bell's religious symbolism and its placement outside a public building. It was surveyed by the Smithsonian's "Save Outdoor Sculpture!" program in July 1993, though its condition was undetermined.

See also
 1989 in art
 History of Korean Americans in Portland, Oregon
 Host Analog (1991) and The Dream (1998), also located outside the Oregon Convention Center
 Liberty Bell (Portland, Oregon)
 Victory Bell (University of Portland)

References

External links

 Sister city gives bell (January 13, 1989), Eugene Register-Guard
 Bells to stay despite Christian objections (November 28, 1990), The Bulletin
 Bell of Sisterhood, Oregon Convention Center, Portland, Oregon at Waymarking

1989 establishments in Oregon
1989 sculptures
Bronze sculptures in Oregon
Individual bells in the United States
Lloyd District, Portland, Oregon
Northeast Portland, Oregon
Outdoor sculptures in Portland, Oregon
Works by Korean people